Hesar Jalal (also Romanized as Ḩeşār Jalāl; also known as Dar Chenār Jālāi, Dar Chenār Jalāl, and Dar-e Chenār Jalāl) is a village in Bala Rokh Rural District, Jolgeh Rokh District, Torbat-e Heydarieh County, Razavi Khorasan Province, Iran. At the 2006 census, its population was 208, in 51 families.

References 

Populated places in Torbat-e Heydarieh County